Terror Night (also known as Bloody Movie) is a 1987 American slasher film directed by Nick Marino.

Plot
When a group of kids sneak into the dilapidated, apparently-abandoned mansion of vanished silent film star Lance Hayward, they are methodically killed off by the psychotic actor, who dons costumes from his classic film roles for each murder.

Cast
John Ireland - Lance Hayward 
Cameron Mitchell - Detective Sanders 
Alan Hale Jr. - Jake Nelson 
Staci Greason - Kathy 
William Butler - Chip 
Michelle Bauer - Jo 
Timothy Elwell - Angel
Carla Baron - Lorraine 
Ken Abraham  - Greg 
Aldo Ray - Captain Ned 
Dan Haggerty - Ted Michaels

Production
While producer Nick Marino is credited as the director, numerous cast and crew members assert that several uncredited directors worked on the film, including Fred Lincoln and Andre DeToth (the latter of whom had not officially directed a film for almost 20 years). Several accounts claim that DeToth convinced veteran actors John Ireland and Cameron Mitchell to join the cast, and shot the scenes they appear in after the majority of principal photography had been completed. DeToth wore a neckbrace during shooting, after suffering an injury.

One shooting location was an estate which had once belonged to Errol Flynn.

Release
Although filming was completed in 1987, no record appears to exist of the film having an official release until 2004, when Fred Olen Ray's Retromedia put it on DVD under the title Bloody Movie. A Legacy Entertainment release from 2005 uses the film's original title.

Critical reception
Allmovie called the film a "substandard horror film" and that "the real fun to be had in Terror Night is its virtually limitless source of bizarre trivia for dedicated exploitation buffs." DVD Talk's Daniel W. Kelly wrote, "With a storyline revolving around vintage movies and appearances by some recognizable has-beens, the film has more of a camp quality than horror. It's not the worst of the genre, but it's not the best. It's a bit simple and unexciting."

References

External links 

 
 

1987 films
American slasher films
1987 horror films
1980s slasher films
1980s English-language films
1980s American films